Lisa Hall is an English singer from Chesterfield, Derbyshire, England. She was lead singer of a band called lisahall which released an album, Is This Real?, in 1998, and an EP in 2007 titled Connection 17. The song "Is This Real?" was a minor hit and featured in the film, Practical Magic.

Discography
Is This Real? (1998)
Connection 17 EP (2007)

References

Year of birth missing (living people)
Living people
English women pop singers
English electronic musicians
English rock singers
People from Chesterfield, Derbyshire
British trip hop musicians
English women in electronic music
20th-century English women singers
20th-century English singers
21st-century English women singers
21st-century English singers